Umm al-Shawf or Umm ash Shauf (Umm esh Shauf) was a Palestinian Arab village located 29.5 km south of Haifa, on the sloping section of Wadi al-Marah. It was depopulated as a result of a military assault between May 12–14, just before the outbreak of the 1948 Arab-Israeli war.

History
In 1859 the population was 150, and the cultivation was 21  feddans.

In 1882, the PEF's Survey of Western Palestine described Umm ash Shuf as: "a small village well supplied with water from two springs on the north, on which side is a little garden." 

A population list from about 1887 showed that  Umm esh Shuf had about  375 inhabitants, all Muslim.

British Mandate era
In the 1922 census of Palestine, conducted by the British Mandate authorities, Umm al-Shuf had a population of 252 Muslims,  increasing in the  1931 census  to 353 Muslims, in a total of  73  houses.

In 1945, it had a population of 480 Muslim inhabitants, with 7,426 dunams of land.  Of this, 107 dunums of land were for  plantations and irrigable land, 6,175 for cereals,  while 31 dunams were classified as built-up land.

1948 and aftermath
Umm ash Shauf became depopulated after  an assault from IZL troops in early May, 1948.

IZL troops searched some refugees from Umm ash Shauf, and found one pistol and one rifle. They took seven young men from the refugees aside, and when none of them admitted to owning the weapons, they were all executed.

Following the war the area was incorporated into the State of Israel and the moshav of Givat Nili was founded in 1953 on the village's land, south of the village site.

In 1992 the village site was described: "Piles of stone debris from the houses are scattered about the site, which is overgrown with cactuses, thorns, and bushes. The shrine of Shaykh 'Abd Allah still stands."

References

Bibliography

External links
Welcome To Umm al-Shawf
Umm al-Shawf, Zochrot
Survey of Western Palestine, Map 8:  IAA, Wikimedia commons

Arab villages depopulated prior to the 1948 Arab–Israeli War
District of Haifa